Kothur G. Manjunath is an Indian politician and former member of the Karnataka Legislative Assembly from the Mulbagal constituency. Manjunath entered the election as an independent candidate, having been denied the ticked by the Congress party, but has later joined the party. In 2015 Manjunath was involved in controversy regarding a caste certificate issued for him and he was denied to participate in the 2018 Karnataka assembly election due to court order for fake certificate .

References

Indian National Congress politicians from Karnataka
Living people
Karnataka MLAs 2013–2018
Year of birth missing (living people)